Interaction School of Performing Arts Co. (abbreviated as InterAction) (Previously known as Interaction Children's Theatre, or IACT) is performing arts school in Saint John, New Brunswick. It was founded in 2001 by Kate Wilcott, and is the only performing arts school of its kind in Southern New Brunswick. It serves hundreds of students each year through weekly classes, summer camps, and school outreach.

Past shows

The Sound of Music (2007)

The Wizard of Oz (2008)

Nicholas Knock (2002, 2016)

Peter Pan (2003, 2009)

Jacob Two Two Meets the Hooded Fang (2004, 2012)

How to Eat Like a Child (2005, 2014)

Charlotte's Web (2006, 2012, 2016)

East of the Sun, West of the Moon (2006)

Treasure Island (2007, 2016)

The Saint John History Mystery (2007, 2010, 2017)

The Snow Queen (2008, 2014)

The Jungle Book (2009, 2018)

Robin Hood (2010)

Around the World In Eighty Days (2011)

Cinderella (2011, 2019)

Pirates of Penzance (2012)

Just So Stories (2013)

Hansel & Gretel (2013)

Peter & the Wolf (2014)

Alice Through the Looking-Glass (2014)

Peter Pan: The Panto (2015)

Jack and the Beanstalk: A Giant Panto (2015)

School of Rock (2017)

External links
 InterAction School of Performing Arts

Drama schools in Canada
Culture of Saint John, New Brunswick
2001 establishments in New Brunswick